Nazareth Martín Vázquez (born 26 February 2004) is a Spanish footballer who plays as a defender for Sevilla.

Club career
Martín started her career at Sevilla.

References

External links
Profile at La Liga

2004 births
Living people
Women's association football defenders
Spanish women's footballers
Footballers from Seville
Sevilla FC (women) players
Primera División (women) players